Nursing is a profession within the healthcare sector focused on the care of individuals, families, and communities so they may attain, maintain, or recover optimal health and quality of life. Nurses may be differentiated from other healthcare providers by their approach to patient care, training, and scope of practice. Nurses practice in many specialties with differing levels of prescription authority. Nurses comprise the largest component of most healthcare environments; but there is evidence of international shortages of qualified nurses. Nurses collaborate with other healthcare providers such as physicians, nurse practitioners, physical therapists, and psychologists. Unlike nurse practitioners, nurses typically cannot prescribe medications in the US.  Nurse practitioners are nurses with a graduate degree in advanced practice nursing. They practice independently in a variety of settings in more than half of the United States. Since the postwar period, nurse education has undergone a process of diversification towards advanced and specialized credentials, and many of the traditional regulations and provider roles are changing.

Nurses develop a plan of care, working collaboratively with physicians, therapists, the patient, the patient's family, and other team members that focuses on treating illness to improve quality of life. In the United Kingdom and the United States, clinical nurse specialists and nurse practitioners, diagnose health problems and prescribe the correct medications and other therapies, depending on particular state regulations. Nurses may help coordinate the patient care performed by other members of a multidisciplinary health care team such as therapists, medical practitioners, and dietitians. Nurses provide care both interdependently, for example, with physicians, and independently as nursing professionals. In addition to providing care and support, nurses educate the public and promote health and wellness.

History

Premodern
Nursing historians face the challenges of determining whether care provided to the sick or injured in antiquity is called nursing care. In the fifth century BC, for example, the Hippocratic Collection in places describes skilled care and observation of patients by male "attendants," who may have been early nurses. Around 600 BC in India, it is recorded in Sushruta Samhita, Book 3, Chapter V about the role of the nurse as "the different parts or members of the body as mentioned before including the skin, cannot be correctly described by one who is not well versed in anatomy. Hence, anyone desirous of acquiring a thorough knowledge of anatomy should prepare a dead body and carefully, observe, by dissecting it, and examining its different parts."

Before the foundation of modern nursing, members of religious orders such as nuns and monks often provided nursing-like care. Examples exist in Christian, Islamic, and Buddhist traditions amongst others. Phoebe, mentioned in Romans 16 has been described in many sources as "the first visiting nurse". These traditions were influential in the development of the ethos of modern nursing. The religious roots of modern nursing remain in evidence today in many countries. One example in the United Kingdom is the use of the historical title "sister" to refer to a senior nurse in the past.

During the Reformation of the 16th century, Protestant reformers shut down the monasteries and convents, allowing a few hundred municipal hospices to remain in operation in northern Europe. Those nuns who had been serving as nurses were given pensions or told to get married and stay home. Nursing care went to the inexperienced as traditional caretakers, rooted in the Roman Catholic Church, were removed from their positions. The nursing profession suffered a major setback for approximately 200 years.

19th century

During the Crimean War the Grand Duchess Elena Pavlovna issued the call for women to join the Order of Exaltation of the Cross (Krestodvizhenskaya obshchina) for the year of service in the military hospitals. The first section of twenty-eight "sisters", headed by Aleksandra Petrovna Stakhovich, the Directress of the Order, went off to the Crimea early in November 1854.

Florence Nightingale laid the foundations of professional nursing after the Crimean War. Nightingale believed that nursing was a social freedom and mission for women. She believed that any educated woman can help improve the care of the medically sick. Her Notes on Nursing (1859) became popular. The Nightingale model of professional education, having set up one of the first schools of nursing that is connected to a continuously operating hospital and medical school, spread widely in Europe and North America after 1870. Nightingale was also a pioneer of the graphical presentation of statistical data.

Florence Nightingale worked by sub concepts of the environmental theory. She included five factors that helped nurses in her time of working in poor sanitation and with uneducated nurses. These factors included (1) fresh air, (2) clean water, (3) a working drainage system, (4) cleanliness, and (5) good light or sunlight. Nightingale believed that a clean, working environment were important in caring for patients. In the 19th century, this theory was ideal for helping patients, providing a guide for nurses to alter the environment around the patient for the better of their health.

Nightingale's recommendations built upon the successes of Jamaican "doctresses" such as Mary Seacole, who like Nightingale, served in the Crimean War. Seacole practised hygiene and the use of herbs in healing wounded soldiers and those suffering from diseases in the 19th century in the Crimea, Central America, and Jamaica. Her predecessors had great success as healers in the Colony of Jamaica in the 18th century, and they included Seacole's mother, Mrs. Grant, Sarah Adams, Cubah Cornwallis, and Grace Donne, the mistress and doctress to Jamaica's wealthiest planter, Simon Taylor.

Other important nurses in the development of the profession include:
Agnes Hunt from Shropshire was the first orthopedic nurse and was pivotal in the emergence of the orthopedic hospital The Robert Jones & Agnes Hunt Hospital in Oswestry, Shropshire.
Valérie de Gasparin who opened, with her husband Agénor de Gasparin, the first nursing school in the world : La Source, in Lausanne, Switzerland. 
Agnes Jones, who established a nurse training regime at the Brownlow Hill infirmary, Liverpool, in 1865.
Linda Richards, who established quality nursing schools in the United States and Japan, and was officially the first professionally trained nurse in the US, graduating in 1873 from the New England Hospital for Women and Children in Boston. 
Clarissa Harlowe "Clara" Barton, a pioneer American teacher, patent clerk, nurse, and humanitarian, and the founder of the American Red Cross.
 Saint Marianne Cope, a Sister of St. Francis who opened and operated some of the first general hospitals in the United States, instituting cleanliness standards which influenced the development of America's modern hospital system.

Red Cross chapters, which began appearing after the establishment of the International Committee of the Red Cross in 1863, offered employment and professionalization opportunities for nurses (despite initial objections from Florence Nightingale). Catholic orders such as Little Sisters of the Poor, Sisters of Mercy, Sisters of St. Mary, St. Francis Health Services, Inc. and Sisters of Charity built hospitals and provided nursing services during this period. In turn, the modern deaconess movement began in Germany in 1836. Within a half century, there were over 5,000 deaconesses in Europe.

Formal use of nurses in the modern military began in the latter half of the nineteenth century. Nurses saw active duty in the First Boer War, the Egyptian Campaign (1882), and the Sudan Campaign (1883).

20th century

Hospital-based training came to the fore in the early 1900s, with an emphasis on practical experience. The Nightingale-style school began to disappear. Hospitals and physicians saw women in nursing as a source of free or inexpensive labor. Exploitation of nurses was not uncommon by employers, physicians, and educational providers.

Many nurses saw active duty in World War I, but the profession was transformed during the Second World War. British nurses of the Army Nursing Service were part of every overseas campaign. More nurses volunteered for service in the US Army and Navy than any other occupation. The Nazis had their own Brown Nurses, 40,000 strong. Two dozen German Red Cross nurses were awarded the Iron Cross for heroism under fire.

The modern era saw the development of undergraduate and post-graduate nursing degrees. Advancement of nursing research and a desire for association and organization led to the formation of a wide variety of professional organizations and academic journals. Growing recognition of nursing as a distinct academic discipline was accompanied by an awareness of the need to define the theoretical basis for practice.

In the 19th and early 20th century, nursing was considered a women's profession, just as doctoring was a men's profession. With increasing expectations of workplace equality during the late 20th century, nursing became an officially gender-neutral profession, though in practice the percentage of male nurses remains well below that of female physicians in the early 21st century.

Shortages
The biggest shortages of nurses and midwives are in South East Asia and Africa. A global survey by McKinsey & Company in 2022 found that between 28% and 38% of nurse respondents in the United States, the United Kingdom, Singapore, Japan, and France said they were likely to leave their current role in direct patient care in the next year. Nursing shortages are a rising risk in many countries. The top five factors which they said would make them stay were
A safe working environment
Work-life balance
Caring and trusting team-mates
Doing meaningful work
Flexible work schedule 
Pay was eighth on the list.  An American survey in 2003 found about half the respondents were considering leaving.

Definition

Although nursing practice varies both through its various specialties and countries, these nursing organizations offer the following definitions:

As a profession

The authority for the practice of nursing is based upon a social contract that delineates professional rights and responsibilities as well as mechanisms for public accountability. In almost all countries, nursing practice is defined and governed by law, and entrance to the profession is regulated at the national or state level.

The aim of the nursing community worldwide is for its professionals to ensure quality care for all, while maintaining their credentials, code of ethics, standards, and competencies, and continuing their education. There are a number of educational paths to becoming a professional nurse, which vary greatly worldwide; all involve extensive study of nursing theory and practice as well as training in clinical skills.

Nurses care for individuals of all ages and cultural backgrounds who are healthy and ill in a holistic manner based on the individual's physical, emotional, psychological, intellectual, social, and spiritual needs. The profession combines physical science, social science, nursing theory, and technology in caring for those individuals.

To work in the nursing profession, all nurses hold one or more credentials depending on their scope of practice and education. In the United States, a Licensed Practical Nurse (LPN) works independently or with a Registered Nurse (RN). The most significant difference between an LPN and RN is found in the requirements for entry to practice, which determines entitlement for their scope of practice. RNs provide scientific, psychological, and technological knowledge in the care of patients and families in many health care settings. RNs may earn additional credentials or degrees.

In the United States, multiple educational paths will qualify a candidate to sit for the licensure examination as an RN. The Associate Degree in Nursing (ADN) is awarded to the nurse who has completed a two-year undergraduate academic degree awarded by community colleges, junior colleges, technical colleges, and bachelor's degree-granting colleges and universities upon completion of a course of study usually lasting two years. It is also referred to as Associate in Nursing (AN), Associate of Applied Science in Nursing (AAS), or Associate of Science in Nursing (ASN). The Bachelor of Science in Nursing (BSN) is awarded to the nurse who has earned an American four-year academic degree in the science and principles of nursing, granted by a tertiary education university or similarly accredited school. After completing either the LPN or either RN education programs in the United States, graduates are eligible to sit for a licensing examination to become a nurse, the passing of which is required for the nursing license. The National Licensure Examination (NCLEX) test is a standardized exam (including multiple choice, select all that apply, fill in the blank and "hot spot" questions) that nurses take to become licensed. It costs two-hundred dollars to take and examines a nurses ability to properly care for a client. Study books and practice tests are available for purchase.

Some nurses follow the traditional role of working in a hospital setting. Other options include: pediatrics, neonatal, maternity, OBGYN, geriatrics, ambulatory, and nurse anesthetists and informatics (eHealth). There are many other options nurses can explore depending on the type of degree and education acquired. These options can also include, community health, mental health, clinical nursing specialists, and nurse midwives. RNs may also pursue different roles as advanced practice nurses.

Nurses are not doctors' assistants. This is possible in certain situations, but nurses more often are independently caring for their patients or assisting other nurses. RNs treat patients, record their medical history, provide emotional support, and provide follow-up care. Nurses also help doctors perform diagnostic tests. Nurses are almost always working on their own or with other nurses. However, they also assist doctors in the emergency room or in trauma care when help is needed.

Gender issues

Despite equal opportunity legislation, nursing has continued to be a female-dominated profession in many countries; according to the WHO's 2020 State of the World's Nursing, approximately 90% of the nursing workforce is female. For instance, the male-to-female ratio of nurses is approximately 1:19 in Canada and the United States. This ratio is represented around the world. Notable exceptions include Francophone Africa, which includes the countries of Benin, Burkina Faso, Cameroon, Chad, Congo, Côte d'Ivoire, the Democratic Republic of Congo, Djibouti, Guinea, Gabon, Mali, Mauritania, Niger, Rwanda, Senegal, and Togo, which all have more male than female nurses. In Europe, in countries such as Spain, Portugal, Czech Republic and Italy, over 20% of nurses are male. In the United Kingdom, 11% of nurses and midwives registered with the Nursing and Midwifery Council (NMC) are male. The number of male nurses in the United States doubled between 1980 and 2000. However female nurses are still more common, but male nurses receive more pay on average.

Research has indicated that there can be negative effects of diversity within nursing. When there is a heavier focus on diversity in nursing, the quality of care or performance of the nurses can be hindered. Research demonstrates that as people begin to be different in a work setting, this can create issues if not addressed correctly. When hospitals begin to focus on diversity over their patients, the quality of care can be negatively affected if diversity becomes the main goal.

Minorities in U.S. nursing 
Statistically speaking, in the United States 19.2% of nursing positions are held by people of minority backgrounds. The remaining 80.8% of positions are held by Caucasian individuals, particularly women.

Theory and process 

Nursing practice is the actual provision of nursing care. In providing care, nurses implement the nursing care plan using the nursing process. This is based around a specific nursing theory which is selected in consideration with the care setting and the population served. In providing nursing care, the nurse uses both nursing theory and best practice derived from nursing research. The nursing process is made up of five steps: 1.evaluate, 2. implement, 3. plan, 4. diagnose, and 5. assess. Nurses are able to use this process from the American Nurses Association to determine the best care they can provide for the patient. There are many other diverse nursing theories as well.

In general terms, the nursing process is the method used to assess and diagnose needs, plan outcomes and interventions, implement interventions, and evaluate the outcomes of the care provided. Like other disciplines, the profession has developed different theories derived from sometimes diverse philosophical beliefs and paradigms or worldviews to help nurses direct their activities to accomplish specific goals.

Scope of activities

Activities of daily living assistance
 Nurses manage and coordinate care to support activities of daily living (ADL). Often the provision of such care is delegated to nursing assistants. This includes assisting in patient mobility, such as moving an activity intolerant patient within bed.

Medication
Medication management and administration are a part of most hospital nursing roles, however, prescribing authority varies between jurisdictions. In many areas, registered nurses administer and manage medications prescribed by a professional with full prescribing authority such as a nurse practitioner or a physician. As nurses are responsible for evaluating patients throughout their care - including before and after medication administration - adjustments to medications are often made through a collaborative effort between the prescriber and the nurse. Regardless of the prescriber, nurses are legally responsible for the drugs they administer. There may be legal implications when there is an error in a prescription, and the nurse could be expected to have noted and reported the error. In the United States, nurses have the right to refuse any medication administration that they deem to be potentially harmful to the patient.
In the United Kingdom there are some nurses who have taken additional specialist training that allows them to prescribe any medications from their scope of practice.

Patient education

The patient's family is often involved in the education. Effective patient education leads to fewer complications and hospital visits. Many times, nurses are very busy and have a hard time giving information to the patient because they have so many other things going on. Educating the patient and their family increases the chance for a better patient experience. Giving the best care requires informing the patient of what is going on and support. While explaining procedure, recovery, and taking care of the patient, nurses also have to help patients and their families cope with different medical situations.

When speaking with the patient, nurses have to be able to communicate in a way that can be understood by the patient. Informing the patient may involve speaking in broad, general terms, using visuals or different reading materials, and even including demonstrations if necessary. The more the patient and their family understand what the nurse is saying, the better healthcare the patient can receive without the assistance of a nurse.

Specialties and practice settings

Nursing is the most diverse of all health care professions. Nurses practice in a wide range of settings but generally nursing is divided depending on the needs of the person being nursed.

The major populations are:
communities/public
family/individual across the lifespan
adult-gerontology
pediatrics
neonatal
women's health/gender-related
mental health
informatics (eHealth)
acute care hospitals
ambulatory settings (physician offices, urgent care settings, camps, etc.)
school/college infirmaries

Nurses with higher degrees allow for specialization within the medical field. There are many specific nursing professions that can be separated into categories of care type, age, gender, certain age group, practice setting, etc. Nurses are able to specialize with a combination of these categories as well. There are also specialist areas such as cardiac nursing, orthopedic nursing, palliative care, perioperative nursing, obstetrical nursing, oncology nursing, nursing informatics, telenursing, radiology, and emergency nursing.

Nurses practice in a wide range of settings, including hospitals, private homes, schools, and pharmaceutical companies. Nurses work in occupational health settings (also called industrial health settings), free-standing clinics and physician offices, nurse-led clinics, long-term care facilities and camps. They also work on cruise ships and in the military service. Nurses act as advisers and consultants to the health care and insurance industries. Many nurses also work in the health advocacy and patient advocacy fields at companies such as Health Advocate, Inc. helping in a variety of clinical and administrative issues. Some are attorneys and others work with attorneys as legal nurse consultants, reviewing patient records to assure that adequate care was provided and testifying in court. Nurses can work on a temporary basis, which involves doing shifts without a contract in a variety of settings, sometimes known as per diem nursing, agency nursing or travel nursing. Nurses work as researchers in laboratories, universities, and research institutions. Nurses have also been delving into the world of informatics, acting as consultants to the creation of computerized charting programs and other software.  Nurse authors publish articles and books to provide essential reference materials.

Occupational hazards

Internationally, there is a serious shortage of nurses. One reason for this shortage is due to the work environment in which nurses practice. In a recent review of the empirical human factors and ergonomic literature specific to nursing performance, nurses were found to work in generally poor environmental conditions. Some countries and states have passed legislation regarding acceptable nurse-to-patient ratios.

The fast-paced and unpredictable nature of health care places nurses at risk for injuries and illnesses, including high occupational stress. Nursing is a particularly stressful profession, and nurses consistently identify stress as a major work-related concern and have among the highest levels of occupational stress when compared to other professions. This stress is caused by the environment, psychosocial stressors, and the demands of nursing, including new technology that must be mastered, the emotional labor involved in nursing, physical labor, shift work, and high workload. This stress puts nurses at risk for short-term and long-term health problems, including sleep disorders, depression, mortality, psychiatric disorders, stress-related illnesses, and illness in general. Nurses are at risk of developing compassion fatigue and moral distress, which can worsen mental health. They also have very high rates of occupational burnout (40%) and emotional exhaustion (43.2%). Burnout and exhaustion increase the risk for illness, medical error, and suboptimal care provision.

Nurses are also at risk for violence and abuse in the workplace. Violence is typically perpetrated by non-staff (e.g. patients or family), whereas abuse is typically perpetrated by other hospital personnel. Of American nurses, 57% reported in 2011 that they had been threatened at work; 17% were physically assaulted.

There are 3 different types of workplace violence that nurses can experience. First, physical violence, which can be hitting, kicking, beating, punching, biting, and using objects to inflict force upon someone. Second, psychological violence is when something is done to impair another person through threats and/or coercion. Third, sexual violence which can include any completed or attempted non-consensual sexual act.

Workplace violence can also be categorized into two different levels, interpersonal violence and organizational coercion. Interpersonal violence could be committed by co-workers and/or patients by others in the hospital. The main form of this level is verbal abuse. Organizational coercion may include an irrationally high workload, forced shifts, forced placement in different wards of the hospital, low salaries, denial of benefits for overwork, poor working environment, and other workplace stressors. These problems can affect the quality of life for these nurses who may experience them. It can be extremely detrimental to nurses if their managers lack understanding of the severity of these problems and do not support the nurses through them.

There are many contributing factors to workplace violence. These factors can be divided into environmental, organizational, and individual psychosocial. The environmental factors can include the specific setting (for example the emergency department), long patient wait times, frequent interruptions, uncertainty regarding the patients' treatment, and heavy workloads. Organizational factors can include inefficient teamwork, organizational injustice, lack of aggression and/or stress management programs, and distrust between colleagues. Individual psychosocial factors may include nurses being young and inexperienced, previous experiences with violence, and a lack of communication skills. Misunderstandings may also occur due to the communication barrier between nurses and patients. An example of this could be the patient's condition being affected by medication, pain, and/or anxiety.

There are many causes of workplace violence. The most common perpetrators for harassment and/or bullying against nursing students were registered nurses including preceptors, mentors, and clinical facilitators. However, the main cause of workplace violence against nurses were patients. 80% of serious violence incidents in health care centers were due to the nurses' interactions with patients.

There are many different effects of workplace violence in the field of Nursing. Workplace violence can have a negative impact on nurses both emotionally and physically. They feel depersonalized, dehumanized, fatigued, worn out, stressed out, and tired. Because of the severity of some incidents of violence, nurses have reported manifestations of burn-out due to the frequent exposure. This can heavily impact of a nurses' mental health and cause nurses to feel unsatisfied with their profession and unsafe in their work environment.

Prevention
There are a number of interventions that can mitigate the occupational hazards of nursing. They can be individual-focused or organization-focused. Individual-focused interventions include stress management programs, which can be customized to individuals. Stress management programs can reduce anxiety, sleep disorders, and other symptoms of stress. Organizational interventions focus on reducing stressful aspects of the work environment by defining stressful characteristics and developing solutions to them. Using organizational and individual interventions together is most effective at reducing stress on nurses. In some Japanese hospitals, powered exoskeletons are used. Lumbar supports (i.e. back belts) have also been trialed.

Worldwide

Americas

United States

In the US, scope of practice is determined by the state or territory in which a nurse is licensed. Each state has its own laws, rules, and regulations governing nursing care. Usually the making of such rules and regulations is delegated to a state board of nursing, which performs day-to-day administration of these rules, licenses for nurses and nursing assistants, and makes decisions on nursing issues. In some states, the terms "nurse" or "nursing" may only be used in conjunction with the practice of a registered nurse (RN) or licensed practical or vocational nurse (LPN/LVN).

In the hospital setting, registered nurses often delegate tasks to LPNs and unlicensed assistive personnel.

RNs are not limited to employment as bedside nurses. They are employed by physicians, attorneys, insurance companies, governmental agencies, community/public health agencies, private industry, school districts, ambulatory surgery centers, among others. Some registered nurses are independent consultants who work for themselves, while others work for large manufacturers or chemical companies. Research nurses conduct or assist in the conduct of research or evaluation (outcome and process) in many areas such as biology, psychology, human development, and health care systems.

Many employers offer flexible work schedules, child care, educational benefits, and bonuses. About 21 percent of registered nurses are union members or covered by union contract.

Nursing is the nation's largest health care profession. In 2017, there were more than 4,015,250 registered nurses and 922,196 licensed practical nurses nationwide. Of all licensed RNs, 2.6 million or 84.8% are employed in nursing. Nurses comprise the largest single component of hospital staff, are the primary providers of hospital patient care, and deliver most of the nation's long-term care. The primary pathway to professional nursing, as compared to technical-level practice, is the four-year Bachelor of Science in nursing (BSN) degree. Registered nurses are prepared either through a BSN program; a three-year associate degree in nursing; or a three-year hospital training program, receiving a hospital diploma. All take the same state licensing exam. (The number of diploma programs has declined steadily—to less than 10 percent of all basic RN education programs—as nursing education has shifted from hospital-operated instruction into the college and university system.)

Educational and licensure requirements

Diploma in Nursing

The oldest method of nursing education is the hospital-based diploma program, which lasts approximately three years. Students take between 30 and 60 credit hours in anatomy, physiology, microbiology, nutrition, chemistry, and other subjects at a college or university, then move on to intensive nursing classes. Until 1996, most RNs in the US were initially educated in nursing by diploma programs. According to the Health Services Resources Administration's 2000 Survey of Nurses only six percent of nurses who graduated from nursing programs in the United States received their education at a Diploma School of Nursing.

Associate Degree in Nursing

The most common initial nursing education is a two-year Associate Degree in Nursing (Associate of Applied Science in Nursing, Associate of Science in nursing, Associate Degree in Nursing), a two-year college degree referred to as an ADN. Some four-year colleges and universities also offer the ADN. Associate degree nursing programs have prerequisite and corequisite courses (which may include English, Math and Human Anatomy and Physiology) and ultimately stretch out the degree-acquiring process to about three years or greater.

Bachelor of Science in Nursing

Another pathway into the profession, or a higher level of education for other nurses, is obtaining a Bachelor of Science in Nursing (BSN), a four-year degree that also prepares nurses for graduate-level education. For the first two years in a BSN program, students usually obtain general education requirements and spend the remaining time in nursing courses. In some new programs the first two years can be substituted for an active LPN license along with the required general studies. Advocates for the ADN and diploma programs state that such programs have an on the job training approach to educating students, while the BSN is an academic degree that emphasizes research and nursing theory. Some states require a specific amount of clinical experience that is the same for both BSN and ADN students. A BSN degree qualifies its holder for administrative, research, consulting and teaching positions that would not usually be available to those with an ADN, but is not necessary for most patient care functions. Nursing schools may be accredited by either the Accreditation Commission for Education in Nursing (ACEN) or the Commission on Collegiate Nursing Education (CCNE).

Graduate education

Advanced education in nursing is done at the master's and doctoral levels. It prepares the graduate for specialization as an advanced practice registered nurse (APRN) or for advanced roles in leadership, management, or education. The clinical nurse leader (CNL) is an advanced generalist who focuses on the improvement of quality and safety outcomes for patients or patient populations from an administrative and staff management focus. Doctoral programs in nursing prepare the student for work in nursing education, health care administration, clinical research, public policy, or advanced clinical practice. Most programs confer the PhD in nursing or Doctor of Nursing Practice (DNP).

Advanced practice registered nurse (APRN)

Areas of advanced nursing practice include that of a nurse practitioner (NP), a certified nurse midwife (CNM), a certified registered nurse anesthetist (CRNA), or a clinical nurse specialist (CNS). Nurse practitioners and CNSs work assessing, diagnosing and treating patients in fields as diverse as family practice, women's health care, emergency nursing, acute/critical care, psychiatry, geriatrics, or pediatrics, additionally, a CNS usually works for a facility to improve patient care, do research, or as a staff educator.

Licensure examination

Completion of any one of these three educational routes allows a graduate nurse to take the NCLEX-RN, the test for licensure as a registered nurse, and is accepted by every state as an adequate indicator of minimum competency for a new graduate. However, controversy exists over the appropriate entry-level preparation of RNs. Some professional organizations believe the BSN should be the sole method of RN preparation and ADN graduates should be licensed as "technical nurses" to work under the supervision of BSN graduates. Others feel the on-the-job experiences of diploma and ADN graduates makes up for any deficiency in theoretical preparation.

Shortage in the United States

RNs are the largest group of health care workers in the United States, with about 2.7 million employed in 2011. It has been reported that the number of new graduates and foreign-trained nurses is insufficient to meet the demand for registered nurses; this is often referred to as the nursing shortage and is expected to increase for the foreseeable future. There are data to support the idea that the nursing shortage is a voluntary shortage.  In other words, nurses are leaving nursing of their own volition. In 2006 it was estimated that approximately 1.8 million nurses chose not to work as a nurse. The Bureau of Labor Statistics (BLS) reported that 296,900 healthcare jobs were created in 2011. RNs make up the majority of the healthcare work force, therefore these positions will be filled primarily by nurses. The BLS also states that by 2020, there will be 1.2 million nursing job openings due to an increase in the workforce, and replacements.

Causes

The International Council of Nursing (ICN), the largest international health professional organization in the world, recognizes the shortage of nurses as a growing crisis in the world. This shortage impacts the healthcare of everyone worldwide. One of the many reasons is that nurses who pursue to become nurses do so very late in their lives. This leads to a non-lengthy employment time. A national survey prepared by the Federation of Nurses and Health Professionals in 2001 found that one in five nurses plans to leave the profession within five years because of unsatisfactory working conditions, including low pay, severe under staffing, high stress, physical demands, mandatory overtime, and irregular hours. Approximately 29.8 percent of all nursing jobs are found in hospitals. However, due to administrative cost cutting, increased nurse's workload, and rapid growth of outpatient services, hospital nursing jobs will experience slower than average growth. Employment in home care and nursing homes is expected to grow rapidly. Though more people are living well into their 80s and 90s, many need the kind of long-term care available at a nursing home. Many nurses will also be needed to help staff the growing number of out-patient facilities, such as HMOs (Health Maintenance Organizations), group medical practices, and ambulatory surgery centers. Nursing specialties will be in great demand. There are, in addition, many part-time employment possibilities.

Levsey, Campbell, and Green voiced their concern about the shortage of nurses, citing Fang, Wilsey-Wisniewski, & Bednash, 2006, who state that over 40,000 qualified nursing applicants were turned away in the 2005–2006 academic year from baccalaureate nursing programs due to a lack of masters and doctoral qualified faculty, and that this number was increased over 9,000 from 32,000 qualified but rejected students from just two years earlier. Several strategies have been offered to mitigate this shortage including; Federal and private support for experienced nurses to enhance their education, incorporating more hybrid/blended nursing courses, and using simulation in lieu of clinical (hospital) training experiences.

Furthermore, there is a shortage of academically qualified instructors to teach at schools of nursing worldwide. The serious need for educational capacity is not being met, which is the underlying most important preparation resource for the nurses of tomorrow. The decrease in faculty everywhere is due to many factors including decrease in satisfaction with the workforce, poor salaries, and reduction in full-time equivalent. Throughout the span of 6 years the nursing faculty shortage has been written about an increasing amount. There is no clear consensus or an organized plan on how to fix the ongoing issue.

Continuing education
With health care knowledge growing steadily, nurses can stay ahead of the curve through continuing education. Continuing education classes and programs enable nurses to provide the best possible care to patients, advance nursing careers, and keep up with Board of Nursing requirements. The American Nurses Association and the American Nursing Credentialing Center are devoted to ensuring nurses have access to quality continuing education offerings. Continuing education classes are calibrated to provide enhanced learning for all levels of nurses. Many States also regulate Continuing Nursing Education. Nursing licensing boards requiring Continuing Nursing Education (CNE) as a condition for licensure, either initial or renewal, accept courses provided by organizations that are accredited by other state licensing boards, by the American Nursing Credentialing Center (ANCC), or by organizations that have been designated as an approver of continuing nursing education by ANCC. There are some exceptions to this rule including the state of California, Florida and Kentucky. National Healthcare Institute has created a list to assist nurses in determining their CNE credit hours requirements. While this list is not all inclusive, it offers details on how to contact nursing licensing boards directly.

Board certification

Professional nursing organizations, through their certification boards, have voluntary certification exams to demonstrate clinical competency in their particular specialty. Completion of the prerequisite work experience allows an RN to register for an examination, and passage gives an RN permission to use a professional designation after their name. For example, passage of the American Association of Critical-care Nurses specialty exam allows a nurse to use the initials 'CCRN' after his or her name. Other organizations and societies have similar procedures.

The American Nurses Credentialing Center, the credentialing arm of the American Nurses Association, is the largest nursing credentialing organization and administers more than 30 specialty examinations.

Correctional nursing

Due to its large prison population, the United States needs many correctional nurses to help inmates receive proper health-care, including mental health treatments for prisoners with psychological issues. The demand for nurse is high everywhere. Nurses working in correctional care have to focus on the care of the patient, not what they did. They are to provide the best possible care because is a compassionate field and all nurses want is to better the patient.

Nurses are not the only health care workers in correctional facilities. Some examples of people who work in correctional facilities are LPNS, RNs, nurse practitioners, doctors, pharmacists, therapists, and specialists.

Role of correctional nurse 
When the individual arrives, nurses perform an initial exam that is just a basic checkup to determine what needs the patient may have while in prison. Here they can discover existing conditions or even signs of substance abuse. A correctional nurse can face a wide variety of healthcare issues including chronic medical conditions, mental health, infectious disease, and much more. Correctional nurses must follow stricter protocols then say in a hospital due to confidentiality. Assessing a patient can be difficult. A deputy or officer may have to be present during exams, which can make the patient feel restricted, and be less open with their medical information. Without the nurse knowing some information from the patient, prevent them from receiving the best care possible.

Canada

History
Canadian nursing dates back to 1639 in Quebec with the Augustine nuns. These nuns were trying to open a mission that cared for the spiritual and physical needs of patients. The establishment of this mission created the first nursing apprenticeship training in North America. In the nineteenth century, some Catholic orders of nursing were trying to spread their message across Canada. Most nurses were female and only had an occasional consultation with a physician. Towards the end of the nineteenth century, hospital care and medical services had been improved and expanded. Much of this was due to Nightingale's influence. In 1874 the first formal nursing training program was started at the General and Marine Hospital in St. Catharines in Ontario.

Education
All Canadian nurses and prospective nurses are heavily encouraged by the Canadian Nurses Association to continue their education to receive a bachelor's degree. This degree may result in better patient outcomes. All Canadian provinces and territories, with the exception of the Yukon and Quebec, require that all nurses have a bachelor's degree. The length of time generally required to obtain this degree is four years. However, some Canadian universities offer a condensed program that is two years in length.

Nursing specialty certification is available through the Canadian Nurses Association in 22 practice areas, including:

 cardiovascular nursing
 community health nursing
 critical care nursing
 pediatric critical care nursing
 emergency nursing
 gastroenterology nursing
 gerontological nursing
 hospice palliative care nursing
 medical-surgical nursing
 neonatal nursing
 nephrology nursing
 neuroscience nursing
 occupational health nursing
 oncology nursing
 orthopedic nursing
 pediatric nursing
 peri-anesthesia nursing
 obstetrical nursing
 peri-operative nursing
 psychiatric and mental health nursing
 rehabilitation nursing
 Wound, ostomy, and continence nursing

Nursing specialty certification generally requires practice, experience, and passing a test that is based on competencies for that specific medical or surgical domain in which nursing care is provided. The certification in gerontological nursing, which involves providing care to the elderly, is offered to not only RNs and NPs but also LPNs.

Latin America
Latin American nursing is based on three levels of training: (a) professional/registered, (b) technical, and (c) auxiliary. The nursing education in Latin America and the Caribbean includes the principles and values of the Universal Health and primary health care. These principles underpin transformative education modalities such as critical and complex thinking development, problem-solving, evidence-based clinical decision-making, and lifelong learning. The Pan American Health Organization/World Health Organization (PAHO/WHO) proposes the Strategy for Universal Access to Health and Universal Health Coverage to improve health outcomes and other basic objectives of health systems based on the right of each person to receive the best standard of health, without exposing people to financial difficulties through nursing intervention.

Europe

Spain
See Nursing in Spain

United Kingdom

To practice lawfully as a registered nurse in the United Kingdom, the practitioner must hold a current and valid registration with the Nursing and Midwifery Council. The title "Registered Nurse" can only be granted to those holding such registration. This protected title is laid down in the Nurses, Midwives and Health Visitors Act, 1997. From April 2016, nurses in the United Kingdom are expected to revalidate every three years which involves providing evidence of further development and active practice.

First and second level
First-level nurses make up the bulk of the registered nurses in the UK. They were previously known by titles such as Registered General Nurse (RGN), Registered Sick Children's Nurse (RSCN), Registered Mental Nurse (RMN), and Registered Nurse (for the) Mentally Handicapped (RNMH). The titles used now are similar, including Registered Nurse Adult (RNA), Registered Nurse Child (RNC), Registered Nurse Mental Health (RNMH), and Registered Nurse (of) Learning Disabilities (RNLD). Second-level nurse training is no longer provided; however, they are still legally able to practice in the United Kingdom as a registered nurse. Many have now either retired or undertaken conversion courses to become first-level nurses. They are entitled to refer to themselves as registered nurses as their registration is on the Nursing & Midwifery Council register of nurses, although most refer to themselves as Enrolled Nurses (ENs) or State Enrolled Nurses (SENs).

Advanced practice

 Nurse practitioners – Most of these nurses obtain a minimum of a master's degree and a desired post grad certificate. They often perform roles similar to those of physicians and physician assistants. They can prescribe medications as independent or supplementary prescribers, although they are still legally regulated, unlike physician's assistants. Most Nurse Practitioners (NPs) have referral and admission rights to hospital specialties. They commonly work in primary care (e.g. General Practitioner (GP) surgeries), Accident and Emergency (A&E) departments, or pediatrics although they are increasingly being seen in other areas of practice. In the UK, the title "nurse practitioner" is legally protected.
 Specialist community public health nurses – traditionally district nurses and health visitors, this group oversees research and publication activities.
 Lecturer-practitioners (also called practice education facilitators) – these nurses work both in the National Health Service (NHS), and in universities. They typically work 2–3 days per week in each setting. In university, they train pre-registration student nurses (see below), and often teach on specialist courses post-registration nurses.
 Lecturers – these nurses are not employed by the NHS. Instead they work full-time in universities, both teaching and performing research.

Managers
Many nurses who have worked in clinical settings for a long time choose to leave clinical nursing and join the ranks of the NHS management. This used to be seen as a natural career progression for those who had reached ward management positions, however with the advent of specialist nursing roles (see above), this has become a less attractive option.

Nonetheless, many nurses fill positions in the senior management structure of NHS organizations, some even as board members. Others choose to stay a little closer to their clinical roots by becoming clinical nurse managers or modern matrons.

Nurse education

Pre-registration
To become a registered nurse, one must complete a program recognised by the Nursing and Midwifery Council (NMC). Currently, this involves completing a degree, available from a range of universities offering these courses, in the chosen branch specialty (see below), leading to both an academic award and professional registration as a 1st level registered nurse. Such a course is a 50/50 split of learning in university (i.e. through lectures, assignments and examinations) and in practice (i.e. supervised patient care within a hospital or community setting).

These courses are three (occasionally four) years' long. The first year is known as the common foundation program (CFP), and teaches the basic knowledge and skills required of all nurses. Skills included in the CFP may include communication, taking observations, administering medication and providing personal care to patients. The remainder of the program consists of training specific to the student's chosen branch of nursing. These are:

 Child nursing
 Mental health nursing
 Learning disabilities nursing

As of 2013, the Nursing and Midwifery Council will require all new nurses qualifying in the UK to hold a degree qualification. However, those nurses who hold a diploma, or even a certificate in nursing are still able to legally practice in the UK, although they are able to undertake university modules to obtain enough credits to top up to a degree.

Midwifery training is similar in length and structure, but is sufficiently different that it is not considered a branch of nursing. There are shortened (18-month) programs to allow nurses already qualified in the adult branch to hold dual registration as a nurse and a midwife. Shortened courses lasting 2 years also exist for graduates of other disciplines to train as nurses. This is achieved by more intense study and a shortening of the common foundation program.

 student nurses in England and Wales can apply for a bursary from the government to support them during their nurse training, and may also be eligible for a student loan, although there has been speculation that this will not be available in the future. Student nurses in Scotland still receive a standard bursary which is not means tested, and their tuition fees continue to be paid – however, they are not eligible for student loans.

Before Project 2000, nurse education was the responsibility of hospitals and was not based in universities; hence many nurses who qualified prior to these reforms do not hold an academic award.

Post-registration
After the point of initial registration, there is an expectation that all qualified nurses will continue to update their skills and knowledge. The Nursing and Midwifery Council insists on a minimum of 35 hours of education every three years, as part of its post registration education and practice (PREP) requirements.

There are also opportunities for many nurses to gain additional clinical skills after qualification. Cannulation, venipuncture, intravenous drug therapy and male catheterization are the most common, although there are many others (such as advanced life support), which some nurses undertake.

Many nurses who qualified with a diploma choose to upgrade their qualification to a degree by studying part-time. Many nurses prefer this option to gaining a degree initially, as there is often an opportunity to study in a specialist field as a part of this upgrading. Financially, in England, it was also much more lucrative, as diploma students get the full bursary during their initial training, and employers often pay for the degree course as well as the nurse's salary.

To become specialist nurses (such as nurse consultants, nurse practitioners etc.) or nurse educators, some nurses undertake further training above bachelor's degree level. Master's degrees exist in various healthcare related topics, and some nurses choose to study for PhDs or other higher academic awards. District nurses and health visitors are also considered specialist nurses, and to become such they must undertake specialist training. This is a one-year full-time degree.

All newly qualifying district nurses and health visitors are trained to prescribe from the Nurse Prescribers' Formulary, a list of medications and dressings typically useful to those carrying out these roles. Many of these (and other) nurses will also undertake training in independent and supplementary prescribing, which allows them (as of 1 May 2006) to prescribe almost any drug in the British National Formulary. This has been the cause of a great deal of debate in both medical and nursing circles.

European Union
In the European Union, the profession of nurse is regulated. A profession is said to be regulated when access and exercise is subject to the possession of a specific professional qualification. The regulated professions database contains a list of regulated professions for nurse in the European Union (EU) member states, European Economic Area (EEA) countries, and Switzerland. This list is covered by the Directive 2005/36/EC.

Asia

India
Nursing education is governed in India by the central body Indian Nursing Council and its norms are implemented through respective State Nursing councils. The list of state nursing councils are available in the official web page of Indian Nursing Council. First formal education in nursing was offered in Madras Medical college, in Madras presidency. 
Indian Nursing Council Act, 1947. Act Year Number: Act No. 19 of December enactment Date of enactment: [31 December 19act] Act Objective: An Act to constitute the Nursing Council of India. To establish uniform standards of training for nurses, midwives, and health visitors. It is implemented with 17 sections and each section indicates the specific legislative role of the council.

The nursing profession was dominated by females in the British colonial period, but in Madras Presidency, men were actively engaged in the profession.

Iran

Israel
Nurses in Israel have a wide variety of responsibilities, including hospital care, patient education, wound care, prenatal and other monitoring, midwifery, and well-baby clinics.

Nursing in Israeli Jewish culture traces its origins to Shifra and Puah, two Hebrew midwives depicted in the Book of Exodus helping women in ancient Egypt give birth and keep their infants safe.

Modern-day nursing was established by nurses sent to Mandatory Palestine and later Israel by the Hadassah organization, as well as a nursing school founded by Henrietta Szold in 1918.  During those times, the United Kingdom regulated midwifery in Mandatory Palestine, but the nurses were not mentioned in the regulation decree.

Today, nurses and midwives are regulated by the Israeli Ministry of Health.

Japan

History
Nursing was not an established part of Japan's healthcare system until 1899 with the Midwives Ordinance. From there the Registered Nurse Ordinance came into play in 1915. This established a legal substantiation to registered nurses all over Japan. A new law geared towards nurses was created during World War II: the Public Health Nurse, Midwife and Nurse Law, established in 1948. It established educational requirements, standards and licensure. There has been a continued effort to improve nursing in Japan. In 1992 the Nursing Human Resource Law was passed. This law created the development of new university programs for nurses. Those programs were designed to raise the education level of the nurses so that they could be better suited for taking care of the public.

Types of nurses
Japan only recognizes four types of nursing and they are Public Health Nursing, Midwifery, Registered Nursing and Assistant Nursing.

Public health
This type of nursing is designed to help the public and is also driven by the public's needs. The goals of public health nurses are to monitor the spread of disease, keep vigilant watch for environmental hazards, educate the community on how to care for and treat themselves, and train for community disasters.

Midwifery
Nurses that are involved with midwifery are independent of any organization. A midwife takes care of a pregnant woman during labour and postpartum. They assist with things like breastfeeding and caring for the child.

Nursing assistant
Nursing assistants, also known as nurse assistants or CNAs (Certified Nursing Assistants), assist patients with basic daily tasks. Individuals who are assistant nurses follow orders from a registered nurse. They report back to the licensed nurse about a patient's condition. Assistant nurses are always supervised by a licensed registered nurse.

Education
In 1952 Japan established the first nursing university in the country. An associate degree was the only level of certification for years. Soon people began to want nursing degrees at a higher level of education. Soon the Bachelor's Degree in Nursing (BSN) was established. Currently, Japan offers doctorate-level degrees of nursing in a good number of its universities.

There are three ways that an individual could become a registered nurse in Japan. After obtaining a high school degree the person could go to a nursing university for four years and earn a bachelor's degree, go to a junior nursing college for three years or go to a nursing school for three years. Regardless of where the individual attends school they must take the national exam. Those who attended a nursing university have a bit of an advantage over those who went to a nursing school. They can take the national exam to be a registered nurse, public health nurse or midwife. In the cases of becoming a midwife or a public health nurse, the student must take a one-year course in their desired field after attending a nursing university and passing the national exam to become a registered nurse. The nursing universities are the best route for someone who wants to become a nurse in Japan. They offer a wider range of general education classes and they also allow for a more rigid teaching style of nursing. These nursing universities train their students to be able to make critical and educated decisions when they are out in the field. Physicians are the ones who are teaching the potential nurses because there are not enough available nurses to teach students. This increases the dominance that physicians have over nurses.

Students that attend a nursing college or just a nursing school receive the same degree as one who graduated from a nursing university would, but they do not have the same educational background. The classes offered at nursing colleges and nursing schools are focused on more practical aspects of nursing. These institutions do not offer many general education classes, so students who attend these schools will solely be focusing on their nursing educations while they are in school. Students who attend a nursing college or school do have the opportunity to become a midwife or a public health nurse. They have to go through a training institute for their desired field after graduating from the nursing school or college. Japanese nurses never have to renew their licenses. Once they have passed their exam, they have their license for life.

Today
Like the United States, Japan is in need of more nurses. The driving force behind this need is the fact that country is aging and needs more medical care for its people. However, the number of available nurses does not seem to be increasing. Nurses face poor working conditions and low social status, and there is a cultural idea that married women quit their jobs for family responsibilities. On average, Japanese nurses make around 280,000 yen a month, and it is one of the higher paying jobs. However, physicians make twice as much as nurses. Similar to other cultures, the Japanese people view nurses as subservient to physicians. According to the American Nurses Association article on Japan, "nursing work has been described using negative terminology such as 'hard, dirty, dangerous, low salary, few holidays, minimal chance of marriage and family, and poor image.'"

There are organizations that unite Japanese nurses like the Japanese Nursing Association (JNA); the JNA is a professional organization and not a union. Members of the JNA lobby politicians and produces publications about nursing. According to the American Nurses Association's article on Japan, the JNA "works toward the improvement in nursing practice through many activities including the development of a policy research group to influence policy development, a code of ethics for nurses, and standards of nursing practice." The JNA also provides certification for specialists in mental health, oncology and community health. There are other organizations, including some that categorize nurses by specialty, like emergency nursing or disaster nursing. One of the older unions that relates to nursing is the Japanese Federation of Medical Workers Union, which was created in 1957. It is a union that includes physicians as well as nurses. This organization was involved with the Nursing Human Resource Law.

Philippines

Philippines is well known for migrant nurses working in other countries especially in the west like the United States of America. It accounts a quarter of overseas nurses in the world. Every year, around 20,000 nurses leave the Philippines to work in more developed countries looking for better pay. Nurses in the Philippines must be licensed by the Professional Regulatory Commission.

Taiwan

In Taiwan, the Ministry of Health and Welfare is in charge of the regulation of nursing. The Taiwan Union of Nurses Association (TUNA) is the union unit in Taiwan, fighting for nurses on payment and working time issues.

Australia

Catholic religious institutes were influential in the development of Australian nursing, founding many of Australia's hospitals – the Irish Sisters of Charity were first to arrive in 1838 and established St Vincent's Hospital, Sydney in 1857 as a free hospital for the poor. They and other orders like the Sisters of Mercy, and in aged care the Sisters of the Little Company of Mary and Little Sisters of the Poor founded hospitals, hospices, research institutes and aged care facilities around Australia.

A census in the 1800s found several hundred nurses working in Western Australia during the colonial period of history, this included Aboriginal female servants who cared for the infirm.

The state nursing licensing bodies amalgamated in Australia in 2011 under the federal body AHPRA (Australian Health Practitioner Registration Authority). Several divisions of nursing license is available and recognized around the country.

 Enrolled nurses may initiate some oral medication orders with a specific competency now included in national curricula but variable in application by agency.
 Registered nurses hold a university degree (enrolled nurses can progress to registered nurse status and do get credit for previous study).
 Nurse practitioners have started emerging from postgraduate programs and work in both private practice and public hospitals and clinics.
 Mental health nurses must complete further training as advanced mental health practitioners in order to administer client referrals under the Mental Health Act.

Australia enjoys the luxury of a national curriculum for vocational nurses, trained at Technical and Further Education (TAFE) colleges or private Registered Training Organization (RTO). Enrolled and registered nurses are identified by the department of immigration as an occupational area of need, although registered nurses are always in shorter supply, and this increases in proportion with specialization.

In 1986 there were a number of rolling industrial actions around the country, culminating when five thousand Victorian nurses went on strike for eighteen days. The hospitals were able to function by hiring casual staff from each other's striking members, but the increased cost forced a decision in the nurses' favor.

See also

Advanced practice registered nurse
Deaconess
Emergency nursing
History of hospitals
History of medicine
History of nursing
History of Nursing in the United Kingdom
History of nursing in the United States
History of Philippine nurses in the United States
Index of nursing articles
Licensed practical nurse
List of nurses
List of nursing specialties
Men in nursing
Nightingale Pledge
Nurse uniform
Nurse–client relationship
Nurse scheduling problem
Nursing care plan
Nursing ethics
Nursing in Australia
Nursing in Germany
Nursing in Hong Kong
Nursing in India
Nursing in Islam
Nursing in Japan
Nursing in Kenya
Nursing in Pakistan
Nursing in Taiwan
Nursing in the Philippines
Nursing in the United States
Nursing school
Nurse stereotypes
Nursing theory
Registered nurse
Transcultural nursing
Wet nurse

References

Bibliography

Further reading
 Advanced Practice and Leadership in Radiology Nursing.  Springer Publishing. (2020). 

 
 Longe, Jacqueline, ed. Gale Encyclopedia of Nursing and Allied Health (6 vol. 2013)

Historical
 Bullough, Vern L. and Bonnie Bullough. The Emergence of Modern Nursing (2nd ed. 1972)
 D'Antonio, Patricia. American Nursing: A History of Knowledge, Authority, and the Meaning of Work (2010), 272pp.
 Dock, Lavinia Lloyd. A Short history of nursing from the earliest times to the present day (1920) full text online; abbreviated version of her four volume A History of Nursing vol 3 online
 Donahue, M. Patricia. Nursing, The Finest Art: An Illustrated History (3rd ed. 2010), includes over 400 illustrations; 416pp; excerpt and text search
 Fairman, Julie and Joan E. Lynaugh. Critical Care Nursing: A History (2000) excerpt and text search
 Judd, Deborah. A History of American Nursing: Trends and Eras (2009) 272pp excerpt and text search
 Kalisch, Philip A., and Beatrice J. Kalisch.  Advance of American Nursing  (3rd ed 1995) ; 4th ed 2003 is titled, American Nursing: A History
 Snodgrass, Mary Ellen. Historical Encyclopedia of Nursing (2004), 354pp; from ancient times to the present

External links

 UNCG Library Betty H. Carter Women Veterans Historical Project: Nurse
 

 
Military supporting service occupations
Rehabilitation team
Health care occupations
Hospital staff